The Indian national team may refer to:
 Association football
 India national football team (Blue Tigers), men's football (soccer)
 India women's national football team, women's football (soccer)
 Badminton
 India national badminton team
 Baseball
 India national baseball team
 Basketball
 India men's national basketball team, men's basketball
 India women's national basketball team, women's basketball
 Cricket
 India national cricket team (Men in Blue), men's cricket
 India women's national cricket team, women's cricket
 Field hockey
 India men's national field hockey team, men's field hockey
 India women's national field hockey team (Golden Girls of Hockey), women's field hockey
 Handball
 India men's national handball team, men's handball
 India women's national handball team, women's handball
 Ice hockey
 India men's national ice hockey team, men's ice hockey
 India women's national ice hockey team, women's ice hockey
 Inline hockey
 India men's national inline hockey team, men's inline hockey
 India women's national inline hockey team, women's inline hockey
 Kabaddi
 India national kabaddi team
 Netball
 India national netball team
 Rugby union
 India national rugby union team
 India national rugby sevens team
 Squash
 India men's national squash team, men's squash
 India women's national squash team, women's squash
 Tennis
 India Davis Cup team, men's tennis
 India Fed Cup team, women's tennis
 Volleyball
 India men's national volleyball team
 India women's national volleyball team